The M548 is a tracked cargo carrier. It is based on the M113 armored personnel carrier, and was built by FMC Corp. at its San Jose, California, and Charleston, West Virginia facilities.

Design

Its light weight allows the use of a relatively small engine to power the vehicle, a 6V53 Detroit two-stroke six cylinder diesel, with an Allison TX-100-1 three-speed automatic transmission, and allows the vehicle to carry a large payload cross-country and to be transported by fixed- and rotary-wing aircraft.

The driveline consists of a front sprocket, five roadwheels and a rear tensioner. Suspension is by torsion bar. Support rollers are not necessary because of the taut and relatively light track. In off-road driving, the driver must be careful to keep the track tension constant. Even with a failed torsion bar the M548 is still roadworthy. The power of the motor drives the transfer gearcase, generator and the cooling of the differential/steering gear. The transfer gearcase can be used as a separating clutch when towing the vehicle and serves to reduce the motor's speed. The power transmission between the drive follows the torque converter with an automatic lock-up clutch.

Variants

United States

 M548A1 

NATO Stock Number (NSN) 2350–01–096–9356

It has the same improvements as M113A2. Improved suspension and cooling system. Entered service in 1982.

 M548A2

 M548A3 

NATO Stock Number (NSN) 2350-01-369-6081

 M1015
Modified M548 to carry Electronic Warfare Shelters. Modifications included installation of 60W, 400hz power system and ground rod driver.  EW Shelters carried included the AN/MLQ-24 TACJAM, and 
AN/TSQ-138 Trailblazer Direction Finding systems.

Swiss Army

 Raupentransportwagen 68 (Rpe Trspw 68) M548 Munitionstransport (tracked transport vehicle 68, M548 ammunition transporter).
 Raupentransportwagen 88 Model 88 (Swiss military license plates M+75829 to M+75882) came into service between 1986 and 1988, in total 54 units. Unlike the previous model 68, the model 88 has "Fleckentarnanstrich" ("stain camouflage pattern") as well as improved diesel heating.
 Raupentransportwagen 68/05

The M548 was mainly used as ammunition transporter in units equipped with the self-propelled M109 howitzer. Also, the armor and weapons mechanic school's recruits, as well as at the tank mortar unit 16/5, used the M548. The usual load is ten pallets of eight 155 mm projectiles including charges and detonators. The handling is done with an electric hoist.

British Army

The British Army used M548 as logistical support for (UK) Armoured Division in the 1991 Gulf War.

The M548 was also used as the basis for the Tracked Rapier anti-aircraft missile system, originally intended for the Iranian Army but delivered to the British Army after the revolution caused the order to be cancelled.

On 25 February 1991, a pair of M548 crewed by personnel of the Royal Electrical and Mechanical Engineers, were supporting 16th/5th The Queen's Royal Lancers who were providing the reconnaissance for the division. They were attacked by an Iraqi Type 59 tank. One M548 was disabled and the Type 59 reengaged the second M548 who returned fire with small arms. Two crewmen (Sergeant Dowling, MM and Lance Corporal F. Evans, REME) were killed.

Gallery

Operators

 : 28 M548A1 in service.
 
 
 
 : M548A1 in service.
 
 : M548A1 in service.
 : Local designation M548 Alfa.
 : 210 M548 in service.

Former operators

Notes

References
 Heller, Urs: Die Panzer der Schweizer Armee von 1920 bis 2008
 Schweizerische Militärmuseum Full

External links

M548 Engine Data

Armored personnel carriers of the United States
Armoured personnel carriers of the Cold War
Armoured personnel carriers of the post–Cold War period
Tracked armoured personnel carriers
Military vehicles introduced in the 1960s